Gaudé is a French surname. Notable people with the surname include:

Joseph Gaudé  (1818–1881), French archetier, bowmaker, and luthier
Laurent Gaudé (born 1972), French author

French-language surnames